The 1990 World Rally Championship was the 18th season of the FIA World Rally Championship. The season consisted of 12 rallies. The drivers' world championship was won by Carlos Sainz in a Toyota Celica GT-Four ST165, ahead of Didier Auriol and Juha Kankkunen. The manufacturers' title was won by Lancia, ahead of Toyota and Mitsubishi.

Teams and Drivers

Events

Results

Driver championship

Manufacturer championship

External links 

 FIA World Rally Championship 1990 at ewrc-results.com
 FIA World Rally Championship 1990 at World Rally Archive

World Rally Championship
World Rally Championship seasons